Spirotheca rosea is a species of tree in the family Malvaceae. It is found from Costa Rica to Bolivia. It is threatened by habitat loss.

References

Bombacoideae
Vulnerable plants
Taxonomy articles created by Polbot